Crown Lands Act is a stock short title used in the United Kingdom for legislation relating to crown lands.

List

United Kingdom

The Crown Lands Act 1623 (21 Jac 1 c 25)
The Crown Lands Act 1702 (1 Ann c 1)
The Crown Land Act 1819 (59 Geo 3 c 94)
The Crown Lands Act 1823 (4 Geo 4 c 18)
The Crown Lands Act 1825 (6 Geo 4 c 17)
The Crown Lands Act 1848 (11 & 12 Vict c 102)
The Crown Lands (Copyholds) Act 1851 (14 & 15 Vict c 46)
The Crown Lands Act 1855 (18 & 19 Vict c 16)

The Crown Lands Acts

The Crown Lands Acts 1829 to 1894 is the collective title of the following Acts:
The Crown Lands Act 1829 (10 Geo 4 c 50)
The Crown Lands Act 1832 (2 & 3 Will 4 c 1)
The Crown Lands (Scotland) Act 1832 (2 & 3 Will 4 c 112)
The Crown Lands (Scotland) Act 1833 (3 & 4 Will 4 c 69)
The Crown Lands (Scotland) Act 1835 (5 & 6 Will 4 c 58)
The Crown Lands Act 1841 (5 Vict c 1)
The Crown Lands Act 1845 (8 & 9 Vict c 99)
The Crown Lands Act 1851 (14 & 15 Vict c 42)
The Crown Lands Act 1852 (15 & 16 Vict c 62)
The Crown Lands Act 1853 (16 & 17 Vict c 56)
The Crown Lands Act 1866 (29 & 30 Vict c 62)
The Crown Lands Act 1873 (36 & 37 Vict c 36)
The Crown Lands Act 1885 (48 & 49 Vict c 79)
The Crown Lands Act 1894 (57 & 58 Vict c 43)

The Crown Lands Act 1906 (6 Edw 7 c 28) may be cited with the Crown Lands Acts 1829 to 1894.

The Crown Lands Acts 1829 to 1927 was the collective title of the Crown Lands Act 1927 (17 & 18 Geo 5 c 23) and the Crown Lands Acts 1829 to 1894.

The Crown Lands Acts 1829 to 1936 is the collective title of Part II of the Crown Lands Act 1936 (26 Geo 5 & 1 Edw 8 c 47) and the Crown Lands Acts 1829 to 1936.

New South Wales
Crown Lands Acts 1861 (NSW)

See also
List of short titles

References

Lists of legislation by short title